The 2022–23 season will be the 21st season in the existence of Oud-Heverlee Leuven and its third consecutive season in the top flight of Belgian football. In addition to the domestic league, Oud-Heverlee Leuven will participate in this season's edition of the Belgian Cup.

Players
This section lists players who were in Oud-Heveree Leuven's first team squad at any point during the 2022–23 season and appeared at least once on the match sheet (possibly as unused substitute)
The symbol ℒ indicates a player who is on loan from another club
The symbol ¥ indicates a youngster

Did not appear on match sheet
The following players were listed as part of Oud-Heverlee Leuven's first-team squad during the 2022–23 season, but never appeared on the match sheet

Transfers

Transfers In

Transfers Out

Pre-season and friendlies

Competitions

Overall record

Pro League

League table

Results summary

Results by round

Matches

Belgian Cup

Results

Notes

References

Oud-Heverlee Leuven
OH Leuven